Late Night Tales: Friendly Fires is a mix album compiled by Friendly Fires, released on 5 November 2012. It is the thirtieth album in the Late Night Tales series.

"...the perfect prescription of head, heart and footwork that defines ideal participants for constructing Late Night Tales"

Their compilation features tracks from artists such as SBTRKT, Bibio, Cocteau Twins, Laurel Halo and Stereolab. It also features an exclusive Friendly Fires' cover of Eberhard Schoener + Sting's song "Why Don't You Answer?" off the 1978 album Flashback.

History
In November 2012, a music video was released for Friendly Fires' cover "Why Don't You Answer?", directed by Fred Rowson for Colonel Blimp. It was premiered on The Guardians new music blog.

Track listing

References

External links
Official Friendly Fires site
Official Friendly Fires late Night Tales Page

2012 compilation albums
Friendly Fires albums
Friendly Fires